The 1956 NAIA Football National Championship (also known as the 1956 Aluminum Bowl) was played on December 22, 1956 at War Memorial Stadium in Little Rock, Arkansas. Montana State and Saint Joseph's (IN) played to a 0–0 tie, and both teams were declared co-champions. During its one season stay in Little Rock, the NAIA Championship game was called the Aluminum Bowl.

References

 
NAIA Football National Championship
Saint Joseph's Pumas football
Montana State Bobcats football games
December 1956 sports events in the United States
NAIA football